Aghcheh Qeshlaq (also Romanized as Āghcheh Qeshlāq; also known as Āghcheh Qeshlāqī and Āqcheh Qeshlāq) is a village in Naqdi Rural District, Meshgin-e Sharqi District, Meshgin Shahr County, Ardabil Province, Iran. At the 2006 census, its population was 70, in 14 families.

References 

Towns and villages in Meshgin Shahr County